Stefano Moretti (born Ancona, Italy) was a musician, singer and teacher of music upon the island of Corfu.

Biography
Moretti was maestro al cembalo of a group within Naples. The group had performed during 1790 within San Giacomo. He is considered important to the ascendency of Ionian music through his tuition of the author of the melody for the Greek National Anthem, Nikolaos Mantzaros.

References

Greek musicians
People from Ancona